The epithet Lucky or the Lucky may refer to:

People
 Dietrich, Count of Oldenburg (c. 1398–1440), also known as Theodoric the Lucky
 Elias Jackson Lucky Baldwin (1828–1909), American businessman and investor
 Leif Erikson (c. 970–c. 1020), Norse explorer also known as Leif the Lucky
 Eugene B. Fluckey (1913–2007), US Navy rear admiral and World War II submarine commander
 Aloysius Lucky Gordon, jazz pianist and singer involved in the Profumo Affair political scandal
 Leo Lucky Grills (1928–2007), Australian character actor
 Anthony Joseph Lucky Isibor (born 1977), Nigerian footballer
 Charles Lindbergh (1902–1974), American aviator, author, inventor, explorer and social activist nicknamed "Lucky Lindy"
 Charlie Lucky Luciano (1897–1962), Italian-American mobster
 Lucius Venable Lucky Millinder (1910–1966), American rhythm and blues and swing bandleader
 Earl Lucky Teter (1901–1942), American stunt driver and promoter
 Eli Lucky Thompson (1924-2005), American jazz saxophonist
 Charles Weeghman (1874-1938), one of the founders of the short-lived baseball Federal League
 Rodney Lucky Whitehead (born 1992), American football player
 Lucky Yates (born 1967), American actor and comedian best known for voicing Dr. Krieger in the animated sitcom Archer

Fictional characters
 Lucky Luke, main character of a humorous comics series with the same name
 Lucas Lorenzo Lucky Spencer, from the soap opera General Hospital
 the protagonist of the Lucky Starr series of juvenile science fiction novels by Isaac Asimov
 Ojo the Lucky, in the Oz book series by L. Frank Baum
 Lucky Navarro-Prescott, from Spirit Untamed

See also
 List of people known as the Fortunate
 List of people known as the Unfortunate

Lists of people by epithet